Abdulla Mahaevich Izhaev (1920 – 1994) was a Karachay soldier in Red Army during World War II who was posthumously awarded the title Hero of the Russian Federation in 1995; he had been nominated for the Order of Glory 1st class during the war, but did not receive it.

Biography 
AIzhaev was born in 1920 in  aul, an area located within present-day Karachayevsky District of Karachay-Cherkessia.

In September 1941 he became a soldier of Red Army. He completed courses for machine gunners and for snipers. From February 1942 he helped to produce ammunition.

October 1942 is the month when he started to participate in actions. He participated in battles of Central Front, Bryansk Front and 1st Ukrainian Front. He was heavily injured. During the Battle of Kursk he knocked out three enemy tanks. Later he was injured again, it happened two times. At the end of the war he was in Berlin. He was awarded with Order of Glory twice. He was not awarded the Order of Glory 1st class because of ethnicity.

In 1946 he was demobilized and deported to the Kirghiz SSR because of his Karachay ethnicity. During the Khrushchev thaw the Karachay people were allowed to return to their republic, so 1957 he returned his homeland, where he worked at sovkhoz "Uchkeken". He died in 1994.

Awards 

 Hero of the Russian Federation
 Medal "for Battle Merit"
 Order of the Patriotic War 2nd class
 Order of Glory 2nd and 3rd class
 Two Medal "for Courage"
 Campaign and jubilee medals

References

External links 
 Ижаев Абдулла Махаевич (Izhaev Abdulla Mahaevic), informational portal «Karachays.com» (in Russian)

Soviet military personnel of World War II
Heroes of the Russian Federation
1994 deaths
1920 births